Statistics of Swiss Super League in the 1973–74 season.

Overview
The Nationalliga A season 1973–74 was contested under 14 teams. These were the top 12 teams from the previous 1972–73 season and the two newly promoted teams Xamax and Chênois. The championship was played in a double round robin. The champions would qualify for the 1974–75 European Cup, the second and third placed teams were to qualify for 1974–75 UEFA Cup and the last two teams in the table at the end of the season were to be relegated. Zürich won the championship 12 points ahead of Grasshopper Club, 13 ahead of the Servette and Winterthur. La Chaux-de-Fonds and Chiasso suffered relegation.

League standings

Results

Top goalscorers

References

Sources 
 Switzerland 1973–74 at RSSSF

Swiss Football League seasons
Swiss
1973–74 in Swiss football